The RX rocket family (Roket Eksperimental) is a series of solid-fuel rockets developed by the Indonesian National Institute of Aeronautics and Space (LAPAN).

Individual boosters 
This family is composed of:

RX-250 was launched eight times from 1987 to 2007. RX-320 was launched twice in 2008 and once again in 2014.
RX-420 flew just once in 2009; it is superseded by RX-450 which was launched on 13 May 2015
, the next booster version RX-550 is under construction; the larger ones are only on the drawing board.

Multi-stage rockets 
Once the solid boosters are fully qualified, LAPAN plans to assemble several of them into multi-stage rockets called Roket Pengorbit Satelit or RPS. Four staging configurations have been retained so far:
 RPS-01 Variant 1 (ex-RPS-420)
 First stage: 3 x RX-420
 Second stage: 1 x RX-420
 Third stage: 1 x RX-420 (shorter)
 Fourth stage: 1 x RX-320
 Total height: 
 RPS-01 Variant 2b
 First stage: 1 x RX-550 + 2 x RX-420
 Second stage: 1 x RX-550
 Third stage: 1 x RX-320
 Total height: 
 RPS-01 Variant 3a
 First stage: 1 x RX-450
 Second stage: 1 x RX-450
 Total height: 
 RPS-01 Variant 3b
 First stage: 1 x RX-450 + 2 x RX-320
 Second stage: 1 x RX-450
 Third stage: 1 x RX-320
 Total height: 

Earlier plans for the Pengorbitan-1 and -2 orbital launch vehicles (RPS-420s) were based on the RX-420 engine which was superseded by the RX-450. , integration work is proceeding on variants 3a and 3b, whose engines have all been successfully flight-qualified. 

Since 2019, LAPAN's rocket division PUSTEKROKET has collaborated with AASPT and CGWIC of China in designing newer multiple stage sounding rockets. The design is based on TK-32 sounding rocket as well as RX-450. It is expected the newer design to be able to reach above , simulation showed the rocket is able to reach . 

 RX-452
 First stage: 1 x RX-400 
 Second stage: 1 x RX-450
 Total height:

References

Space launch vehicles of Indonesia